Protobothrops mucrosquamatus is a venomous pit viper species endemic to Asia. Common names include: brown-spotted pit viper, Taiwanese habu and pointed-scaled pit viper. No subspecies are currently recognized. The species was first described by Theodore Cantor in 1839.

Description 

The hemipenes are spinose.

Scalation: dorsal scales in 25 longitudinal rows at midbody; scales on upper surface of head, small, each scale keeled posteriorly; internasals 5–10 times size of adjacent scales, separated by 3–4 scales; supraoculars, long, narrow, undivided, 14–16 small interoculars in line between them; 2 scales on line between upper preocular and nasal scale; 9–11 upper labials, first upper labial separated from nasal by suture; 2–3 small scales between upper labials and subocular; 2–3 rows of temporal scales above upper labials smooth, above those scales keeled; ventrals 200–218; subcaudals 76–91, all paired.

Color pattern: grayish or olive brown above, with dorsal series of large brown, black-edged spots or blotches, and a lateral series of smaller spots; head above brownish, below whitish; belly whitish but heavily powdered with light brown; tail brownish (possibly pink in life [fide M.A. Smith 1943:507]), with series of dark dorsal spots.

Common names 
Brown spotted pitviper, pointed-scaled pit viper, habu, Chinese habu, Formosan pit viper.

Geographic range 
Found from northeastern India (Assam and Mizoram) and Bangladesh, to Myanmar, China (including Hainan, and as far north as Gansu and as far east as Zhejiang), Laos, northern and central Vietnam, also found in northern Thailand as well as in Taiwan. The type locality given is Naga Hills (India). This snake is introduced to Okinawa, Japan.

See also 
 Snakebite

References

Further reading 

 Boulenger, G.A. 1890. The Fauna of British India, Including Ceylon and Burma. Reptilia and Batrachia. Secretary of State for India in Council. (Taylor and Francis, Printers.) London. xviii + 541 pp. (Trimeresurus mucrosquamatus, p. 428.)
 Cantor, T.E. 1839. Spicilegium Serpentium Indicorum [parts 1 and 2]. Proc. Zool. Soc. London, Part VII 1839: 31-34, 49-55.
 Kraus, Fred; Mink, Daniel G.; & Brown, Wesley M. 1996. Crotaline intergeneric relationships based on mitochondrial DNA sequence data. Copeia 1996 (4): 763-773.
 Smith, M.A. 1943. The Fauna of British India, Ceylon and Burma, Including the Whole of the Indo-Chinese Sub-region. Reptilia and Amphibia. Vol. III.—Serpentes. Secretary of State for India. (Taylor and Francis, Printers.) London. xii + 583 pp. (Trimeresurus mucrosquamatus, pp. 507–508.)
 Tu, M.-C. et al. 2000 Phylogeny, Taxonomy, and Biogeography of the Oriental Pit Vipers of the Genus Trimeresurus (Reptilia: Viperida Crotalinae): A Molecular Perspective. Zoological Science 17: 1147–1157.

Mucrosquamatus
Reptiles described in 1839
Taxa named by Theodore Edward Cantor
Snakes of China
Snakes of Vietnam
Snakes of Asia
Reptiles of Bangladesh
Reptiles of China
Reptiles of Hong Kong
Reptiles of India
Reptiles of Laos
Reptiles of Myanmar
Reptiles of Taiwan
Reptiles of Vietnam